FC Kose is a football club based in Kose, Estonia.

Players

Current squad
 As of 29 September 2018.

Statistics

League and Cup

References

Harju County
Kose
Association football clubs established in 1998